General elections were held in Liechtenstein in April 1886.

Electors 
Electors were selected through elections that were held between 6 and 10 April. Each municipality had two electors for every 100 inhabitants.

Results 
The election of Oberland's Landtag members and substitutes was held on 19 April in Vaduz. Of Oberland's 114 electors, 112 were present. Oberland elected six Landtag members and four substitutes. One Landtag seat for Oberland was left vacant as there were candidates from Oberland who did not accept their election as Landtag members.

The election of Unterland's Landtag members and substitutes was held on 20 April in Mauren. Of Unterland's 68 electors, 67 were present. Unterland elected five Landtag members and two substitutes.

Xaver Bargetze and Wendelin Erni did not accept their elections as Oberland's Landtag members. Albert Schädler initially did not accept his election as one of Oberland's Landtag members, but he was elected as one of Oberland's substitutes and was subsequently made to become a Landtag member. Meinrad Ospelt was substituted in to become one of Oberland's Landtag members. Josef Brunhart and Johann Alois Schlegel did not accept their election as Oberland's substitutes.

References 

Liechtenstein
1886 in Liechtenstein
Elections in Liechtenstein
April 1886 events